Jamaica competed at the 1992 Summer Paralympics in Barcelona, Spain. 4 competitors from Jamaica won 3 medals, 1 silver and 2 bronze, finishing 47th in the medal table.

See also 
 Jamaica at the Paralympics
 Jamaica at the 1992 Summer Olympics

References 

Jamaica at the Paralympics
Nations at the 1992 Summer Paralympics